The Shades series is a series of young adult horror novels written by Australian horror writer Rob Hood. The four-volume series (Hodder Headline) includes: Shadow Dance, Night Beast, Ancient Light and Black Sun Rising. 

Drawing on the  mythology of ancient Egypt, the Knights Templar and more, Hood created a series about Shadow creatures waging an anti-human war.

External links

Official Site

Young adult novel series
Australian young adult novels
Horror novel series
Australian horror fiction